Sir Patrick de Graham of Lovat was a 13th-14th century Scottish noble.

Patrick was the son of David of Lovat and Mary Bisset. He was a prisoner of King Edward I of England between 1304 until 1308. He signed the Declaration of Arbroath in 1320.

Citations

References

13th-century Scottish people
14th-century Scottish people
Medieval Scottish knights
Scottish people of the Wars of Scottish Independence
Patrick
Signatories to the Declaration of Arbroath